Roger Sargent may refer to:

 Roger Sargent (chemical engineer) (1926 – 2018), a British chemical engineer and professor
 Roger Sargent (photographer) (born 1970), a British photographer, known for hia work with bands and musicians